Nacht-Express was a daily tabloid newspaper published in East Berlin, East Germany, between 1945 and 1953. It was one of the five East German newspapers of which licenses were owned by non-partisan or non-official individuals.

History and profile
Nacht-Express was first published in Berlin on 7 December 1945. Its license holder was a private individual who had no party affiliation or no governmental post. The publisher of Nacht-Express was Express-Verlag, G.m.b.H based in East Berlin. It was an evening newspaper which focused on entertainment-oriented news. It rarely covered public affairs and political news. The paper had detailed sections for sports and for the fiction, criticism, or light literature. Paul Wiegler was the editor of the latter section.  

Rudolf Kurtz was the founding editor-in-chief of the paper. One of the contributors was Hannolore Holtz who wrote on cultural and entertainment news. The paper ceased publication on 30 April 1953.

References

External links

1945 establishments in Germany
1953 establishments in East Germany
Daily newspapers published in Germany
Defunct newspapers published in Germany
Mass media in East Germany
German-language newspapers
Newspapers established in 1945
Newspapers published in Berlin
Publications disestablished in 1953